In graph theory, a locally linear graph is an undirected graph in which every edge belongs to exactly one triangle. Equivalently, for each vertex of the graph, its neighbors are each adjacent to exactly one other neighbor, so the neighbors can be paired up into an induced matching. Locally linear graphs have also been called locally matched graphs.

Many constructions for locally linear graphs are known. Examples of locally linear graphs include the triangular cactus graphs, the line graphs of 3-regular triangle-free graphs, and the Cartesian products of smaller locally linear graphs. Certain Kneser graphs, and certain strongly regular graphs, are also locally linear.

The question of how many edges locally linear graphs can have is one of the formulations of the Ruzsa–Szemerédi problem. Although dense graphs can have a number of edges proportional to the square of the number of vertices, locally linear graphs have a smaller number of edges, falling short of the square by at least a small non-constant factor. The densest planar graphs that can be locally linear are also known. The least dense locally linear graphs are the triangular cactus graphs.

Constructions

Gluing and products

The friendship graphs, graphs formed by gluing together a collection of triangles at a single shared vertex, are locally linear. They are the only finite graphs having the stronger property that every pair of vertices (adjacent or not) share exactly one  common neighbor. More generally every triangular cactus graph, a graph formed by gluing triangles at shared vertices without forming any additional cycles, is locally linear.

Locally linear graphs may be formed from smaller locally linear graphs by the following operation, a form of the clique-sum operation on graphs.
Let  and  be any two locally linear graphs, select a triangle from each of them, and glue the two graphs by merging together corresponding pairs of vertices in the two selected triangles. Then the resulting graph remains locally linear.

The Cartesian product of any two locally linear graphs remains locally linear, because any triangles in the product come from triangles in one or the other factors. For instance, the nine-vertex Paley graph (the graph of the 3-3 duoprism) is the Cartesian product of two triangles. The Hamming graph  is a Cartesian product of  triangles, and again is locally linear.

From smaller graphs
Some graphs that are not themselves locally linear can be used as a framework to construct larger locally linear graphs. One such construction involves line graphs. If  is a 3-regular triangle-free graph, then its line graph  is 4-regular and locally linear. Every 4-regular locally linear graph can be constructed in this way. For instance, the graph of the cuboctahedron is the line graph of a cube, so it is locally linear. The locally linear nine-vertex Paley graph, constructed above as a Cartesian product, may also be constructed in a different way as the line graph of the utility graph . The line graph of the Petersen graph is also locally linear by this construction. It has a property analogous to the cages: it is the smallest possible graph in which the largest clique has three vertices, each vertex is in exactly two edge-disjoint cliques, and the shortest cycle with edges from distinct cliques has length five.

A more complicated expansion process applies to planar graphs. Let  be a planar graph embedded in the plane in such a way that every face is a quadrilateral, such as the graph of a cube. For instance, the cuboctahedron can again be produced in this way, from the two faces (the interior and exterior) of a 4-cycle.
The removed 4-cycle of this construction can be seen on the cuboctahedron as a cycle of four diagonals of its square faces, bisecting the polyhedron.

Algebraic constructions
Certain Kneser graphs, graphs constructed from the intersection patterns of equal-size sets, are locally linear. Kneser graphs are described by two parameters, the size of the sets they represent and the size of the universe from which these sets are drawn. The Kneser graph  has  vertices (in the standard notation for binomial coefficients), representing the -element subsets of an -element set. In this graph, two vertices are adjacent when the corresponding subsets are disjoint sets, having no elements in common. The resulting locally linear graph has  vertices and  edges. For instance, for  the Kneser graph  is locally linear with 15 vertices and 45 edges.

Locally linear graphs can also be constructed from progression-free sets of numbers.
Let  be a prime number, and let  be a subset of the numbers modulo  such that no three members of  form an arithmetic progression modulo . (That is,  is a Salem–Spencer set modulo .) This set can be used to construct a tripartite graph with  vertices and  edges that is locally linear. Form a graph as the union of all of these triangles. Because it is a union of triangles, every edge of the resulting graph belongs to a triangle. However, there can be no other triangles than the ones formed in this way.

Regularity

Regular graphs with few vertices
A graph is regular when all of its vertices have the same degree, the number of incident edges. Every locally linear graph must have even degree at each vertex, because the edges at each vertex can be paired up into triangles. The Cartesian product of two locally linear regular graphs is again locally linear and regular, with degree equal to the sum of the degrees of the factors. Therefore, one can take Cartesian products of locally linear graphs of degree two (triangles) to produce regular locally linear graphs of every even degree.

The -regular locally linear graphs must have at least  vertices, because there are this many vertices among any triangle and its neighbors alone. (No two vertices of the triangle can share a neighbor without violating local linearity.) Regular graphs with exactly this many vertices are possible only when  is 1, 2, 3, or 5, and are uniquely defined for each of these four cases. The four regular graphs meeting this bound on the number of vertices are the 3-vertex 2-regular triangle , the 9-vertex 4-regular Paley graph, the 15-vertex 6-regular Kneser graph , and the 27-vertex 10-regular complement graph of the Schläfli graph. The final 27-vertex 10-regular graph also represents the intersection graph of the 27 lines on a cubic surface.

Strongly regular graphs
When  the graph is locally linear. The locally linear graphs already mentioned above that are strongly regular graphs and their parameters are
the triangle (3,2,1,0),
the nine-vertex Paley graph (9,4,1,2),
the Kneser graph  (15,6,1,3), and
the complement of the Schläfli graph (27,10,1,5).
Other locally linear strongly regular graphs include
the Brouwer–Haemers graph (81,20,1,6),
the Berlekamp–van Lint–Seidel graph (243,22,1,2),
the Cossidente–Penttila graph (378,52,1,8), and
the Games graph (729,112,1,20).
Other potentially-valid combinations with  include (99,14,1,2) and (115,18,1,3) but it is unknown whether strongly regular graphs with those parameters exist. The question of the existence of a strongly regular graph with parameters (99,14,1,2) is known as Conway's 99-graph problem, and John Horton Conway has offered a $1000 prize for its solution.

Distance-regular graphs
There are finitely many distance-regular graphs of degree 4 or 6 that are locally linear. Beyond the strongly regular graphs of the same degrees, they also include the line graph of the Petersen graph, the Hamming graph , and the halved Foster graph.

Density

One formulation of the Ruzsa–Szemerédi problem asks for the maximum number of edges in an -vertex locally linear graph. The construction of locally linear graphs from progression-free sets leads to the densest known locally linear graphs, with  edges.

These examples show that the  upper bound can be attained.

Every locally linear graph has the property that it remains connected after any matching is removed from it, because in any path through the graph, each matched edge can be replaced by the other two edges of its triangle. Among the graphs with this property, the least dense are the triangular cactus graphs, which are also the least dense locally linear graphs.

References

Graph families